PBG is a three-letter abbreviation which may represent:
 Palm Beach Gardens, Florida, a US city
 Parallel Blade with Ground, a term used in theater lighting to designate an ordinary NEMA 5-15 electrical power connector
 The Pepsi Bottling Group (NYSE:PBG), a US company
 Porphobilinogen
 Plattsburgh International Airport in Plattsburgh, New York (IATA Code: PBG)
 Photonic band gap, a property of Photonic crystals
 Paintball gun (marker)
 President's Bodyguard, a regiment of the Indian Army
 Pole of Good Government, a former political alliance in Italy